Bennett Park was a ballpark in Detroit. Located at Michigan and Trumbull Avenues, it was home to the Detroit Tigers and was named after Charlie Bennett, a former player whose career ended after a train accident in 1894. 

The Tigers began play at Bennett Park in the minor Western League with a 17–2 win over the Columbus Senators on April 28, 1896. That league was renamed the American League in 1900, and the AL declared itself a major league starting in 1901.

History

The ballpark sat 5,000 when it opened in 1896 and was gradually expanded to 14,000 by the time it was closed after the 1911 season.  When the American League became a major league in 1901 the ballpark seated 8,500, the smallest park in the majors. Private parties built "Wildcat" bleachers on the rooftops of houses behind the left field fence, to the chagrin of Tiger ownership, since people paid to watch games from those bleachers but the Tigers did not get revenue.

The park was noted for its dangerous playing surface, with cobblestones beneath the dirt and sometimes protruding over the dirt.

This small ballpark enjoyed some big success, as the Tigers and their young sensation Ty Cobb won three consecutive pennants during 1907–1909. However, their success ran out in the post-season on each occasion, when they lost to stronger National League teams in the World Series. This ballpark was hallowed ground to fans of the Chicago Cubs, as it was on this site in both 1907 and 1908 that the Cubs clinched their first two World Series championships (and their last one for over a century, until 2016).

Between the 1911 and 1912 seasons, the Tigers acquired the rest of the block, demolished both the wildcat bleachers and Bennett Park, and built Navin Field on the same site, though the new stadium was shifted by 90°, with home plate where the left field corner had formerly been.

First night game

Bennett Park was home to the first nighttime baseball game in Detroit. On September 24, 1896, the Tigers played their last game of their first season at Bennett Park, an exhibition doubleheader against the Cincinnati Reds. Tigers owner George Arthur Vanderbeck had workers string lights above the stadium for the nighttime game. A crowd of 1200 attended the experiment, which was described by a local newspaper as "an amusing and financial success".

Nighttime baseball did not return to Detroit until June 15, 1948, when the first game under the lights was played at Briggs Stadium.

References

External links

 Baseball-Almanac.com

Defunct Major League Baseball venues
Detroit Tigers stadiums
Sports venues in Detroit
Demolished sports venues in Michigan
1896 establishments in Michigan
Sports venues completed in 1896
1911 disestablishments in Michigan
Sports venues demolished in 1911
Baseball venues in Michigan